Suzi Quatro is the debut solo studio album by the American singer-songwriter and bass guitarist of the same name. The LP was originally released in October 1973, by the record label Rak in most territories. The album was released under Bell Records in the United States and Canada, EMI Records in Japan, and Columbia Records in some European countries. It was titled Can the Can in Australia.

The album was a critical and commercial success, achieving international popularity upon its release, reaching the top 50 in the charts in several territories, peaking at #32 in the UK album charts, #4 in Germany, #5 in the Netherlands, and #2 in Australia. The LP also achieved minor success in the United States, entering the top 150 in the charts there. The single "Can the Can", which was included on the album in most countries, became Quatro's most successful hit, reaching number one in the charts in several European countries and Australia, and had modest success in the US, peaking at 56 in the charts in 1976 when it was re-released in that country a few years later. The album also spawned her second single "48 Crash" which also achieved commercial success, reaching the top ten in several countries, including the UK where it went to number 3.

The Elvis Presley cover "All Shook Up" was given a limited release as a single in the United States, peaking at #85 on the Billboard Chart. Quatro would later claim that Presley himself contacted her and told her that her cover of his song was "the best since [his] own".

Critical reception
Village Voice critic Robert Christgau said, "nothing in her own songwriting equals the one-riff rock of the two Chapman-Chinn singles, especially "48 Crash," and the last time I got off on someone dressed entirely in leather was before John Kay started repeating himself." In a retrospective review for AllMusic, Dave Thompson gave the album four and half stars and wrote that "Suzi Quatro remains one of the most nakedly sexual albums of the entire glam rock epoch -- and one of the hottest debuts of the decade."

Track listing

UK original track listing
All tracks composed by Suzi Quatro and Len Tuckey, except where indicated.

Side one
 "48 Crash" (Mike Chapman, Nicky Chinn) - 3:54
 "Glycerine Queen" - 3:47
 "Shine My Machine" - 3:49
 "Official Suburbian Superman" - 3:05
 "I Wanna Be Your Man" (John Lennon, Paul McCartney) - 3:09
 "Primitive Love" (Mike Chapman, Nicky Chinn) - 4:13

Side two
 "All Shook Up" (Otis Blackwell, Elvis Presley) - 3:48
 "Sticks & Stones" - 3:41
 "Skin Tight Skin" - 4:21
 "Get Back Mama" (Quatro) - 5:52
 "Rockin' Moonbeam" - 2:55
 "Shakin' All Over" (Johnny Kidd) - 3:33

Charts

Year-end charts

Certifications

Notes
Most releases of the album outside of the UK included "Can the Can"; however, later pressings in the UK would later include "Can the Can" also.
"Rockin' Moonbeam" was not included on the album in some countries, including the US and Canadian pressings which omitted both "Rockin' Moonbeam" and "Get Back Mamma" and included "Can the Can" in their replacement.
Australia released the album under the "Can the Can" title, which is written on the album cover, appearing above Len Tuckey, but was otherwise identical to the version pictured above.

Personnel
 Suzi Quatro - bass, lead vocals
 Len Tuckey - guitars, backing vocals, slide guitar
 Alastair McKenzie - piano, backing vocals, electric piano, Mellotron
 Dave Neal - drums, backing vocals

Production
 Engineer – Pete Coleman
 Mastered by – Chris Blair
 Producer – Mike Chapman, Nicky Chinn 
 Cover Photography – Gered Mankowitz

Production notes
Produced at Audio International Studio, London
Mastered at EMI Studios, Abbey Road

Source: Suzi Quatro's Suzi Quatro album cover

References

External links

1973 debut albums
Suzi Quatro albums
Rak Records albums
Albums produced by Mike Chapman